Yoo Hyo-min (born January 5, 1984), professionally known as Yoo In-young (Hangul: 유인영), is a South Korean actress. Yoo began her entertainment career as a commercial model before making her acting debut in 2005. Yoo is best known for her roles in A Man Called God (2010) and Dummy Mommy (2012). In 2013, Yoo was chosen as a model for Elizabeth Arden, the first Korean actor to represent the cosmetic brand exclusively in the Asian region.

Filmography

Film

Television series

Web series

Television show

Music video

Awards and nominations

References

External links
 

1984 births
Living people
South Korean television actresses
South Korean film actresses
Chung-Ang University alumni